The Lokkaren Bridge is a suspension bridge in Namsos municipality in Trøndelag county, Norway. The bridge crosses the Lokkarsundet strait that runs between the mainland of Namsos and the island of Otterøya. The  bridge was opened on 2 December 1977.

References

External links
Pictures of Lokkaren Bridge

Namsos
Road bridges in Trøndelag
Bridges completed in 1977
Suspension bridges in Norway
1977 establishments in Norway